The name Cool TV may represent:

 Cool TV, a television channel in Hungary and Romania
 CoolTV, a defunct cable specialty channel in Canada
 TheCoolTV, a television network in the United States